Didymus metrosideri is an endemic weevil from the Kermadec Islands in New Zealand. This species was discovered by W. L. Wallace during the 1908 Kermedec Islands expedition.

Taxonomy 
D. metrosideri was originally described by Thomas Broun as Acalles metrosiderae. In 1982 G. Kuschel proposed that the new genus Didymus replace the original genus Acalles.

Distribution 
Specimens of this beetle have been discovered on Raoul Island and on Macauley Island.

References

External links 

Beetles of New Zealand
Beetles described in 1910
Endemic fauna of New Zealand
Cryptorhynchinae
Fauna of the Kermadec Islands
Endemic insects of New Zealand